Amenherkhepshef or variant spellings may refer to:

 Amun-her-khepeshef (died  1254 BC), also known by distinguishing name Amun-her-khepeshef A, son of Pharaoh Ramesses II and Queen Nefertari, buried in KV5 in the Valley of the Kings
 Amun-her-khepeshef (20th dynasty), also known by distinguishing name Amun-her-khepeshef B, eldest son and heir of Pharaoh Ramesses III, buried in QV55 in the Valley of the Queens
 Ramesses VI, princely name Amenherkhepshef, or distinguishing name Amenherkhepshef C, the fifth pharaoh of the 20th Dynasty of Egypt
 Amenherkhepshef (mid 12th century BC during the 20th Dynasty), also known by distinguishing name Amenherkhepshef D, son of Ramesses VI with Queen Nubkhesbed, buried in KV13 in the Valley of the Kings
 Amum-Her-Khepesh-Ef ( 1885 BC –  1883 BC), the supposed son of Pharaoh Sen Woset and Queen Hathor-Hotpe, interred in Egypt and cremated in the U.S. in 1950